Karl Kuno Thure Freiherr von Uexküll (March 15, 1908, Heidelberg – September 29, 2004, Freiburg) was a German scholar of psychosomatic medicine and biosemiotics. He developed the approach of his father, Jakob von Uexküll, in the study of living systems and applied it in medicine.

His mother was Gudrun Baroness von Uexküll (Gräfin von Schwerin).

Career
1955–1965 Director of the Medical Outpatient Department at the University of Giessen
1966–1977 Director of the Department of Internal Medicine and Psychosomatics at the University of Ulm

Awards
Honorary Doctor of the University of Tartu (1994)

Works
Der Sinn des Lebens (with Jakob von Uexküll). Godesberg: H.Küpper (1947).
Der Mensch und die Natur. Grundzüge einer Naturphilosophie. Bern: Francke (1953).
Grundfragen der psychosomatischen Medizin. Hamburg: Rowohlt (1963).
Signs, Symbols and Systems. In: T. Sebeok, R. Posner (Hg): A semiotic Landscape. Den Haag, Paris, New York (1974), 487–492.
Lehrbuch der psychosomatischen Medizin. Urban und Schwarzenberg, München; Wien; Baltimore (1979) 
Die Umweltlehre als Theorie der Zeichenprozesse. In: Th v. Uexküll (Hg): Kompositionslehre der Natur. Biologie als undogmatische Naturwissenschaft; ausgewählte Schriften. Frankfurt, Berlin, Wien: Ullstein (1980)
Semiotics and medicine. In: Semiotica 38 (1982), 3/4: 205–215.
Semiotics and the problem of the observer. In: Semiotica 48 (1984), 3/4: 187–195.
Zeichen und Realität als anthroposemiotisches Problem. In: Oehler, Klaus (Hrsg.): Zeichen und Realität. Tübingen, Stauffenburg-Verlag (1984), 1: 61–72. 
Medicine and Semiotics. In: Semiotica, 61 (1986), 3/4: 201–217.
Die Wissenschaft von dem Lebendigen. In: Perspektiven der Philosophie. Neues Jahrbuch (1987), 13: 451–461.
Theorie der Humanmedizin. Grundlagen ärztlichen Denkens und Handelns. (with Wolfgang Wesiack): München: Urban und Schwarzenberg (1988)
Naturwissenschaft als Zeichenlehre. In: Merkur (1989), 43: 225–234.
Die Bedeutung der Semiotik für die Medizin. In: P. Rusterholz, M. Svilar (Ed). Welt der Zeichen - Welt der Wirklichkeit, Berner Universitätsschriften, Band 38, Verlag Paul Haupt (1993), 38: 85–100.
Endosemiosis. (together with Werner Geigges und Jörg Hermann) In: Semiotica, (1993), 96, 1/2, 5–51.
Biosemiose. In: R.Posner, K. Robering, T. Sebeok (Ed.). Semiotik. Berlin, New York: Walter de Gruyter,  (1997), 447–457.
Endosemiose. In: R. Posner, K. Robering, T. Sebeok (Hg.). Semiotik. Berlin, New York: Walter de Gruyter,  (1997), 464–487.
Psychosomatic Medicine. München: Urban & Schwarzenberg (1997).
Theorie der Humanmedizin (with Wolfgang Wesiack). München: Urban & Schwarzenberg (1998).

References

Martin Krampen 2004. Thure von Uexküll - Arzt, Wissenschaftler, Semiotiker. Zeitschrift für Semiotik 26(3/4): 421–428.
Kalevi Kull; Jesper Hoffmeyer 2005. Thure von Uexküll 1908–2004. Sign Systems Studies 33(2): 487–494.

1908 births
2004 deaths
Physicians from Heidelberg
People from the Grand Duchy of Baden
German semioticians
Academic staff of the University of Giessen
Academic staff of the University of Ulm
Recipients of the Order of the Cross of Terra Mariana, 5th Class